General Morrison may refer to:

Alan Morrison (general) (1927–2008), Australian Army major general
David Morrison (born 1956), Australian Army lieutenant general
DeLesseps Story Morrison (1912–1964), U.S. Army Reserve major general
Edward Whipple Bancroft Morrison (1867–1925), Canadian Army major general
George Morrison (British Army officer) (1703–1799), British Army general
John B. Morrison (fl. 1980s–2020s), U.S. Army lieutenant general
John Frank Morrison (1857–1932), U.S. Army major general
Joseph Wanton Morrison (1783–1826), British Army brigadier general
General Samuel Morrison, fictional character from the A-Team